Avdon is an old and uncommon Russian Christian male first name. Its colloquial variant is Ovdon. It is possibly derived from the Biblical Hebrew word abdōn, meaning god's slave, god's servant.

The diminutives of "Avdon" are Avdonya, Avdokha, Avdosha, Avdya, Avda, Avdyusha, and Donya.

The patronymics derived from "Avdon" are "" (Avdonovich; masculine) and "" (Avdonovna; feminine).

References

Notes

Sources
Н. А. Петровский (N. A. Petrovsky). "Словарь русских личных имён" (Dictionary of Russian First Names). ООО Издательство "АСТ". Москва, 2005. 
[1] А. В. Суперанская (A. V. Superanskaya). "Современный словарь личных имён: Сравнение. Происхождение. Написание" (Modern Dictionary of First Names: Comparison. Origins. Spelling). Айрис-пресс. Москва, 2005. 
[2] А. В. Суперанская (A. V. Superanskaya). "Словарь русских имён" (Dictionary of Russian Names). Издательство Эксмо. Москва, 2005.